Palpitation in the Breeze is a 2019 Burmese drama film, directed by Wyne starring Moht Moht Myint Aung, Phway Phway, Khin Wint Wah and Kyaw Ye Aung. The film, produced by  Khayay Phyu Film Production premiered in Myanmar on March 22, 2019.

Cast
Moht Moht Myint Aung as Daw Kyi Pyar
Khin Wint Wah as Kyi Pyar
Phway Phway as Khin Nyein Chan
Kyaw Ye Aung as U Maung Pyay
Nine Nine Htet as Tayar

References

2019 films
2010s Burmese-language films
Burmese drama films
Films shot in Myanmar
Films directed by Wyne